Earthblade is an upcoming platform video game by Extremely OK Games.

Gameplay 
Earthblade is a 2D Metroidvania platform game. The player, as the character Névoa, who has recently returned to a ruined Earth, traverses and dashes between platforms, climbing terrain, and fighting enemies. It is drawn in a pixel art style.

Development 

Extremely OK Games first announced EarthBlade in April 2021 and had begun playtesting by April of the next year. The developer shared the first footage of Earthblade at The Game Awards 2022. Earthblade genre and art style is similar to the developer's 2018 Celeste. It is planned for release in 2024.

References

External links 

 

Upcoming video games scheduled for 2024
Platform games
Indie video games
Video games developed in Canada
Single-player video games
Video games designed by Maddy Thorson